Events from the year 1926 in France.

Incumbents
President: Gaston Doumergue 
President of the Council of Ministers: 
 until 20 July: Aristide Briand
 20 July-23 July: Édouard Herriot
 starting 23 July: Raymond Poincaré

Events
9 May – French navy bombards Damascus because of Druze riots.
15 July – Grand Mosque of Paris inaugurated.
24 November – The village of Rocquebillier on the Riviera is almost destroyed in a massive hailstorm.
The Guide Michelin first awards stars to restaurants.

Arts and literature
Société Nationale des Beaux-Arts institutes the Prix Puvis de Chavannes, named after co-founder and first president, Pierre Puvis de Chavannes.

Sport
20 June – Tour de France begins.
18 July – Tour de France ends, won by Lucien Buysse of Belgium.

Births

January to June
17 January – Robert Filliou, artist (died 1987)
2 February – Philippe Chatrier, tennis player (died 2000)
7 February – Pierre Villette, composer (died 1998)
11 February – Paul Bocuse, chef (died 2018)
19 February – Pierre Guénin, journalist, gay rights activist (died 2017)
1 March – Robert Clary, French-American actor, author and lecturer (died 2022)
19 March – Henri René Guieu, science fiction writer (died 2000)
13 April – André Testut, motor racing driver (died 2005)
8 May – Pierre Broué, historian and Trotskyist (died 2005)
5 June – Claude Berge, mathematician (died 2002)
12 June – Jean-Pierre Munch, cyclist (died 1996)
26 June – Jérôme Lejeune, paediatrician and geneticist (died 1994)

July to December
6 July – Serge Roullet, film director and screenwriter (died 2023)
10 August – Michel Breitman, writer and translator (died 2009)
14 August – René Goscinny, author, editor and humorist (died 1977)
16 August – Roger Agache, archaeologist (died 2011)
17 August 
Maurice Lusien, swimmer (died 2017)
Jean Poiret, actor, director and screenwriter (died 1992)
15 September – Jean-Pierre Serre, mathematician
17 September – Jean-Marie Lustiger, Roman Catholic Archbishop of Paris and cardinal (died 2007)
15 October – Michel Foucault, philosopher, historian, critic and sociologist (died 1984)
1 November – James Marson, politician (died 2017)
3 November – Paul Rebeyrolle, painter (died 2005)
9 November – Raymond Hains, artist and photographer (died 2005)
21 December – Georges Boudarel, academic and Communist militant (died 2003)

Deaths
14 January – René Boylesve, author (born 1867)
28 February – Alphonse Louis Nicolas Borrelly, astronomer (born 1842)
26 March – Georges Aaron Bénédite, Egyptologist (born 1857)
2 July – Émile Coué, psychologist and pharmacist (born 1857)
21 September – Léon Charles Thévenin, telegraph engineer (born 1857)
5 December – Claude Monet, painter (born 1840)

Date unknown
Jean-Camille Formigé, architect (born 1845)

See also
 List of French films of 1926

References

1920s in France